Soyang River is a river of South Korea. It is a river of the Han River system. This river has its source in Inje County, Gangwon, South Korea.

See also 

 Soyang Dam
 List of rivers of Korea

References 

Rivers of South Korea